Francesca Duranti (born January 2, 1935) is an Italian writer.

Personal life and education 
She was born Francesca Rossi in Genoa and received a law degree from the University of Pisa. She married Enrico Magnini in 1956; they had one child and separated in 1960. She married Massimo Duranti, they had one child and divorced in 1976.

Writing career 
She began writing during the 1970s. Her first novel La bambina was published in 1976. In 1978, she published Piazza mia bella piazza, followed by La casa sul lago della luna, which received the Bagutta Prize and the  Premio Martina Franca,  in 1984. In 1988, Duranti published Effetti personali, which received the Premio Campiello.

Her work explores the interactions between life and art. Some early works are based on her own life experiences; for example, La bambina draws from her own childhood.

Selected works 
 Sogni mancini (1996), received the Rapallo Carige Prize 
 L’ultimo viaggio della canaria (2004), received the Rapallo Carige Prize

References 

1935 births
Living people
Italian women novelists
20th-century Italian women writers
Premio Campiello winners
Italian women lawyers
20th-century Italian lawyers
20th-century women lawyers